The 2018 Rushmoor Borough Council election took place on 3 May 2018 to elect members of Rushmoor Borough Council in England. This was on the same day as other local elections.

Two seats were up for election in the West Heath ward due to the resignation of an incumbent.

Results

|}

Ward results

Aldershot Park

Cherrywood

Cove and Southwood

Empress

Fernhill

Knellwood

Manor Park

North Town

Rowhill

St John’s

St Mark’s

Wellington

West Heath

References 

2018 English local elections
2018
2010s in Hampshire